Steven Shafer is a professor of anesthesiology at Stanford University. In 2011, the International Society of Anaesthetic Pharmacology gave him their lifetime achievement award.

Education

Shafer graduated from Princeton University with an A.B. He received his M.D. from Stanford and completed his anesthesia residency at the University of Pennsylvania.

Career
Shafer is the former (2006-2016) editor-in-chief of Anesthesia & Analgesia. He specializes in the clinical pharmacology of intravenous anesthetic drugs. Shafer left Stanford in 2007 to go to Columbia University College of Physicians and Surgeons as a professor of anesthesiology. In 2012, Shafer returned to Stanford as an anesthesia professor in the Stanford University Medical Center. In addition, he is adjunct associate professor of bioengineering and therapeutic sciences at the University of California, San Francisco.

Shafer was a co-founder of PharmacoFore, which subsequently changed its name to Signature Therapeutics. He has held executive positions at other companies, including Pharsight and two software development companies.

Shafer appeared as an expert witness in the Michael Jackson manslaughter trial.

Bibliography

References

External links 
 

Year of birth missing (living people)
Living people
American anesthesiologists
Stanford University faculty
Columbia University faculty
Stanford University School of Medicine alumni
Princeton University alumni
University of California, San Francisco faculty